Island of Wakfu is an action-adventure game developed by Ankama Play and published by Microsoft Studios for the Xbox 360's Xbox Live Arcade service. It is set in the universe of Dofus 10,000 years before the events of the game and is a spin-off of the MMORPG Wakfu.

Gameplay

Islands of Wakfu features colorful 2D visuals and is played from an isometric perspective. It features a total of three playable characters (Nora, Efrim and The Platypus) and incorporates a unique blend of beat 'em up, shoot 'em up and puzzle elements.

The game can be played solo or local cooperatively. When played solo, the player can switch between characters Nora and Efrim simultaneously. Whereas, the first player controls Nora and the second, Efrim, if playing co-op. The third playable character, The Platypus, can be controlled when playing as Efrim, by default.

Plot

The story takes place in a Dark fantasy universe, in the game, players assume the roles of Nora (the last surviving Eliatrope) and her dragon brother Efrim of whom are on a mission to reserve and restore the remains of their world, after a meteorite crashed on a nearby planet, reviving a malevolent curse.

Development and release

The game was officially announced in a December 18, 2008 press report by Ankama Play for a planned late 2009 release. However, the 2009 release date was later changed to Spring 2011.

References

External links 
 
Islands of Wakfu at Xbox.com

2011 video games
Action-adventure games
Cooperative video games
Dark fantasy video games
Microsoft games
Microsoft XNA games
Video games developed in France
Video game spin-offs
Video games featuring female protagonists
Video games with isometric graphics
Xbox 360 Live Arcade games
Xbox 360-only games
Xbox 360 games